San Fernando, officially the Municipality of San Fernando, is a 1st class municipality in the province of Bukidnon, Philippines. According to the 2020 census, it has a population of 63,045 people.

History
The natives of Bukidnon known as Tigwahanons and Matigsalugs were the original inhabitants of this area.  They settled along the fertile river valleys of the Tigwa and Salug rivers.  These people were nomadic by nature and subsisted mainly by hunting and eating forest products but they also maintained small plots of corn and root crops in places where they built their temporary shelters.   They have a feudal type of government headed by a political chieftain known as “Datu”, who also acted as their religious leader and armed forces chief.

San Fernando was formerly part of the municipalities of Maramag and Malaybalay. Pursuant to Executive Order No. 347 of President Carlos P. Garcia dated July 29, 1959, the Malaybalay barrios along the Tigua River and the Maramag barrios along the Salug River were separated from their mother towns to create the Municipality of San Fernando.  During the reign of Gov. Teodoro Oblad and Cong. Cesar Fortich, a proposal was submitted to the defunct Congress for the creation of this district into municipality. On June 18, 1966, San Fernando was created into a municipality under R.A. 4789 and was named in honor of Fernando Damasco, the Father of former Gov. Catalino Damasco.  The first set of government was installed at Barangay Namnam, approximately 48 kilometers away from Valencia City.

The government resettlement program for Mindanao during the 1960s and 1970s attracted immigrants from Luzon and the Visayas. The arrival of the migrants, attracted by the town's rich agricultural potential, created more settlements in the area and contributed much in the development of the area. The original occupants of the town, the Tigwahanon and the Matigsalug, were then replaced by these lowlanders or “dumagats””. Only few natives remained in the lowland and the majority of them settled in the interior and mountainous areas of the municipality.

On July 27, 1970, the municipal council passed a resolution transferring the seat of government from Namnam to Barangay Halapitan.
Halapitan - The present town of Halapitan used to be an abaca farm of Victoriano Bantug who served as mayor in the 70's. Mr. Tamin, a teacher in Namnam used to drop by at Mr. Bantug's house in present Halapitan on his way to Malaybalay, thus the word "Hapit", or drop by. Talangihon which is now Comawas was the loading dock for bamboo rafts as inhabitants sail along Tigoa River connecting Pulangui River onto Lumbayao. Mr. Bantug eventually distributed lands to newcomers and eventually the name Halapitan stayed on " Hapitanan".

Geography
San Fernando is located in the southeast portion of the province of Bukidnon. It is bounded in the north by Malaybalay City and Cabanglasan, in the east by the municipality of Talaingod, Davao del Norte in the south by Davao City and North Cotabato province; and in the west by Quezon and Valencia City.

Topography
About eighty percent of the municipality's area is mountainous. The Pantaron Mountain Range (Central Cordillera of Mindanao) forms part of the natural border between the municipality and the Davao provinces in the west while the Aga Mountains between Valencia City and Quezon.

The Tigwa River valley occupies the northern and central parts of the municipality while the Salug River valley is found in the southern part of the municipality.

Bodies of Water
The municipality has two major river systems: Tigwa River and Salug River. The Tigwa River is a tributary of the Pulangi River, which empties into the Mindanao River in Cotabato City. The Salug River is a tributary of the Davao River that empties into Davao Gulf in the south.

Climate

Barangays

San Fernando is politically subdivided into 24 barangays.

Demographics

The municipality had a total population of 50,207 people in 2010, up from 40,165 in 2000, with 71 persons per square km.

Economy

The municipality is predominantly agricultural with corn as the major product followed by rice and abaca. Rattan, banana, bamboo, vegetables and root crops are also produced in the municipality.

Government
The municipality is administered by the Municipal Mayor together with the Vice Mayor and the Sangguniang Bayan. The mayor is the local chief executive officer of the municipality while the Sangguniang Bayan (or SB) serves as the local legislative arm as mandated by the Local Government Code of the Philippines of 1991.

Under the Mayor's Office are the following offices: Municipal Planning and Development Office, Municipal Civil Registrar's Office, Municipal Engineering Office, Municipal Accounting Office, Municipal Treasurer's Office, Municipal Assessor's Office, Municipal Social Welfare and Development Office, Municipal Agriculture Office and Municipal Budget Office. These offices are mandated to deliver the basic social services to the inhabitants of the municipality.

The Sangguniang Bayan is headed by the Vice Mayor, acting as its presiding officer, and seven (7) Sangguniang Bayan councilors. They formulate laws and ordinances relevant to the municipality.

San Fernando has twenty-four (24) barangays headed by a barangay captain together with seven Sangguniang Pambarangay members. 25 Barangays including Langasihan.

Transportation
The municipality can be reached by bus, jeepneys and habal-habal or motorcycles.

References

External links

 [ Philippine Standard Geographic Code]
2007 Official Philippine Census Information

Municipalities of Bukidnon
Populated places on the Rio Grande de Mindanao
Establishments by Philippine executive order